The 1992 Formula 3000 International Championship was the eighth season of Formula 3000 in Europe. Luca Badoer won the ten-round championship.

Technical changes

Reynard was once again the dominant manufacturer. After Lola failed to win a race in 1991, there were only six of their cars on the grid in 1992. Simtek produced an upgrade of the previous year's RALT. Two cars were produced and sold to Piquet Racing, however after a test by Nelson Piquet himself they were sold in favor of a Reynard. Piemme Motors bought one car for Giambattista Busi, who usually started near the back of the grid and never managed to finish a race. The other car was sold to Japan, and RALT announced its withdrawal from F3000 early in the season.

Exotic fuel blends were banned after Agip's success in 1991. A stricter interpretation of the rules gave the cars long sidepods, which greatly increased the area of the flat floor, making the cars very sensitive to pitch changes.

Season summary

Jordi Gené won on his debut at the Silverstone, which would turn out to be his only F3000 victory. Emanuele Naspetti won on the streets of Pau in spite of a collision with Andrea Montermini. Both continued, but Montermini later crashed at the Foch statue. Montermini won the next race in Barcelona.

At Enna, the Crypton team introduced a monodamper front suspension, and their driver Luca Badoer took the victory. He then won the next two rounds in Germany as other teams scrambled to catch up, either by switching to the dominant Mader-tuned Cosworth DFVs or with monodampers, now available as an upgrade from Reynard.

At Spa-Francorchamps, Badoer suffered a high-speed accident at Radillion. His car went into the barriers backwards, and Badoer's head hit the steel roll hoop, which broke his helmet and knocked him unconscious. Montermini took the victory, and followed this with a win on F3000's only visit to the twisty Albacete circuit in Spain.

At Nogaro, Badoer took pole position drove away to a convincing victory to clinch the title with a round to spare. In the finale, Badoer and Montermini collided, leaving Jean-Marc Gounon to take Lola's only victory of the year, followed by Olivier Panis in another Lola and David Coulthard.

Drivers and teams

Calendar

Final points standings

Driver

For every race points were awarded: 9 points to the winner, 6 for runner-up, 4 for third place, 3 for fourth place, 2 for fifth place and 1 for sixth place. No additional points were awarded.

Complete Overview

R16=retired, but classified  R=retired NS=did not start NQ=did not qualify DIS(6)=disqualified after finishing in eleventh place (25)=place after practice, but grid position not held free

References

External links
 International F3000 1992 Retrieved from Unofficial F3000 Information on 6 November 2009

International Formula 3000
International Formula 3000 seasons